Hermitage of St. Simon (Ermita de Sant Simó) is a small Spanish parish church located in the east end of the Royal Road, in the faubourg of Havana, in the municipality of Mataró, comarca of Maresme. Dating to 1611, the seaside chapel is well-known along the Catalonia coast. It has a single nave in keeping with ancient seafaring tradition. The Feast Day is 28 October.

References

Bibliography

External links

Festa de Sant Simó

Churches in Catalonia
Maresme
1611 establishments in Spain
Roman Catholic churches completed in 1611
17th-century Roman Catholic church buildings in Spain